Naren Stiven Solano Perea (born 15 January 1996) is a professional Colombian footballer who plays as a forward.

Club career

FK Senica
Solano made his Fortuna Liga debut for Senica against Spartak Trnava on 21 July 2018.

References

External links
 FK Senica official club profile 
 
 Futbalnet profile 
 
 Ligy.sk profile 

1996 births
Living people
Footballers from Cali
Colombian footballers
Colombian expatriate footballers
Association football forwards
Independiente Medellín footballers
Boyacá Chicó F.C. footballers
FK Senica players
AFC Nové Mesto nad Váhom players
Slovak Super Liga players
Deportes Valdivia footballers
Primera B de Chile players
Expatriate footballers in Chile
Colombian expatriate sportspeople in Chile
Expatriate footballers in Slovakia
Colombian expatriate sportspeople in Slovakia